Cyclopentene is a chemical compound with the formula . It is a colorless liquid with a petrol-like odor.  It has few applications, and thus is mainly used as a minor component of gasoline, present in concentrations of less than 1%. It is one of the principal cycloalkenes.

Production
Cyclopentene is produced industrially in large amounts by steam cracking of naphtha. In the laboratory, it is prepared by dehydration of cyclopentanol.

It can also produced by the catalytic hydrogenation of cyclopentadiene.

Use in mechanistic organic chemistry
Cyclopentene is used in analysing the mechanisms of organic reactions.  It can be obtained from vinylcyclopropane in the vinylcyclopropane-cyclopentene rearrangement.

The polymerization of cyclopentene by Ziegler-Natta catalysts yields 1,3-linkages, not the more typical 1,2-linked polymer.

References

External links

Monomers